

Erich Reuter (30 March 1904  – 30 October 1989) was a German general in the Wehrmacht during World War II. He was a recipient of the  Knight's Cross of the Iron Cross with Oak Leaves of Nazi Germany.

Awards and decorations

 German Cross in Gold on 12 March 1942 as Major in Infanterie-Regiment 122
 Knight's Cross of the Iron Cross with Oak Leaves
 Knight's Cross on 17 August 1942 as Oberstleutnant and commander of Infanterie-Regiment 122
 710th Oak Leaves on 21 January 1945 as Generalmajor and commander of 46. Infanterie-Division

References

Citations

Bibliography

 
 
 
 

1904 births
1989 deaths
Lieutenant generals of the German Army (Wehrmacht)
Recipients of the Gold German Cross
Recipients of the Knight's Cross of the Iron Cross with Oak Leaves
Military personnel from North Rhine-Westphalia
German Army officers of World War II
People from Oberbergischer Kreis